Franz Ratzenberger (born 30 March 1965 in Grieskirchen) is an Austrian former sprinter. He represented his country at the 1992 Summer Olympics as well as one outdoor and two indoor World Championships.

In 1993 he tested positive for a banned steroid Metandienone and was subsequently banned from competition for two years. That same year he retired from the sport.

Personal bests
Outdoor
100 metres – 10.34 (+1.1 m/s, Linz 1992)
Indoor
60 metres – 6.62 (Vienna 1992)
200 metres – 21.65 (Seville 1991)

References

All-Athletics profile

1965 births
Living people
Austrian male sprinters
People from Grieskirchen District
Athletes (track and field) at the 1992 Summer Olympics
Doping cases in athletics
Austrian sportspeople in doping cases
Olympic athletes of Austria
Sportspeople from Upper Austria